Amy Foster is a short story written by Joseph Conrad in 1901.

Amy Foster may also refer to:

Amy Foster (athlete) (born 1988), Irish athlete
Amy C. Foster, American engineer
Amy S. Foster (born 1973), Canadian songwriter

See also
Ami Foster, American actress